Christian Fröhlich (born 27 October 1977) is a German football coach and former player who played as a midfielder.

References

External links
 

1977 births
Living people
Footballers from Dresden
German footballers
Association football midfielders
Germany under-21 international footballers
Germany youth international footballers
TSV 1860 Munich II players
Chemnitzer FC players
FC St. Pauli players
Dynamo Dresden players
FC Carl Zeiss Jena players
Kickers Offenbach players
2. Bundesliga players
3. Liga players
German football managers
3. Liga managers
FC Carl Zeiss Jena managers